Meadville Downtown Historic District is a national historic district located at Meadville, Crawford County, Pennsylvania.  The district is centered on Diamond Park and includes 81 contributing buildings and 18 contributing sites in the central business district of Meadville.  It includes a mix of commercial, industrial, and governmental / institutional buildings built between about 1800 and 1940.  They are in a variety of popular architectural styles including Greek Revival, Italianate, Second Empire, and Victorian.  Notable buildings include the Crawford County Courthouse, Ralston Block (1880-1890), Kronenfeld Building, Market House (1870), Crawford County Trust Building (1920), U.S. Post Office (1907), Masonic Building, Keystone View Company, and Academy of Music.

It was added to the National Register of Historic Places in 1984.

References

Historic districts on the National Register of Historic Places in Pennsylvania
Greek Revival architecture in Pennsylvania
Italianate architecture in Pennsylvania
Second Empire architecture in Pennsylvania
Buildings and structures in Crawford County, Pennsylvania
Meadville, Pennsylvania
National Register of Historic Places in Crawford County, Pennsylvania